Norbert Prünster (born 6 January 1954) is an Italian ice hockey player. He competed in the men's tournament at the 1984 Winter Olympics.

References

External links

1954 births
Living people
Bolzano HC players
HC Merano players
Ice hockey players at the 1984 Winter Olympics
Italian ice hockey players
Olympic ice hockey players of Italy
Sportspeople from Merano